The following is a timeline of the history of the city of Smolensk, Russia.

Prior to 20th century

 1137 - Russian Orthodox Diocese of Smolensk established.
 1150 - Assumption Cathedral consecrated.
 1408 - Smolensk becomes part of the Grand Duchy of Lithuania.
 1508 - Smolensk becomes capital of the Smolensk Voivodeship.
 1514 - 1 August: Siege of Smolensk (1514); Moscow in power.
 1602 - Smolensk Kremlin built.
 1609 - Siege of Smolensk (1609–11) by Polish forces begins near city.
 1611 - Siege of Smolensk (1609–11) ends; Poles in power.
 1613 - Siege of Smolensk (1613–17) begins.
 1631 - Władysław IV Vasa-funded Royal Bastion (citadel) completed.
 1632 - October: Siege of Smolensk (1632–33) begins.
 1636 - Polish Roman Catholic Diocese of Smolensk established.
 1654 - Siege of Smolensk (1654) and Russians retook power.
 1667 - Smolensk becomes part of Russia per Truce of Andrusovo.
 1674 - Assumption Cathedral building demolished.
 1772 - Assumption Cathedral rebuilt.
 1804 - Birth of Mikhail Glinka Russian classical musician.
 1812 - August: Battle of Smolensk (1812); city taken by French forces.
 1868 - Smolensk railway station opened.
 1870 - Moscow–Brest Railway opens.
 1878 -  newspaper begins publication.
 1885 -  unveiled.
 1888 -  founded.
 1894 - Polish church built.
 1897 - Population: 46,889.
 1900 - Population: 57,405.

20th century

 1901 - Tram begins operating.
 1913 - Population: 76,000.
 1917 - Labor strikes.
 1918 - Smolensk State University established.
 1926 - Smolensk Aviation Plant established.
 1936 -  of city established.
 1937
 City becomes part of the Smolensk Oblast.
  established.
 1939 - Smolensk Regional Philharmonic orchestra established.

 1941
 July–August: Battle of Smolensk (1941).
 20 July: Forced labour camp No. 126 for Zivilarbeiters established by the Germans.
 July: Dulag 240 transit camp for prisoners of war relocated from Jabłonna to Smolensk.
 November: Dulag 240 transit camp for POWs relocated from Smolensk to Rzhev.
 1942
 Cinema opens.
 July: Forced labour camp for Jewish men established by the Germans.
 1943
 August–October: Battle of Smolensk (1943).
 25 September: Forced labour camps for Zivilarbeiters and Jews dissolved.
 1954 - Glinka Festival begins.
 1961 -  established.
 1963 -  (diamonds) and  established.
 1965
  established.
 Population: 183,000.
 1979 -  established.
 1985 - Population: 331,000.
 1988 -  in use.
 1989 - Population: 341,483.
 1992 - Football Club Kristall Smolensk formed.
 1998
  becomes mayor.
  becomes governor of Smolensk Oblast.
 2000 - City becomes part of the Central Federal District.

21st century

 2002
  becomes governor of Smolensk Oblast.
 Smolensk Archive relocated to Russia from the US.
 2003 - Vladislav Khaletsky becomes mayor.
 2004 - Football Club Dnepr Smolensk formed.
 2010
 10 April: Smolensk air disaster; Polish president Lech Kaczyński killed.
 Population: 326,863.

See also
 Smolensk history
 Timelines of other cities in the Central Federal District of Russia: Moscow, Voronezh

References

This article incorporates information from the Russian Wikipedia.

Bibliography

 
 
 
  (research utilizing the Smolensk Archive)

External links

 Digital Public Library of America. Items related to Smolensk, various dates

History of Smolensk
smolensk
Years in Russia